Smoke'n'Soul is a roots reggae/dancehall band from Belgrade, Serbia. It was formed in 2000 by Miloš Iković and Vladimir Krkljuš. Over the years they have developed their organic sound that incorporates all of the roots reggae foundations and rasta philosophies, as well as introducing heavy funk and soul influence. Smoke'n'Soul won Rebel Demo - Battle of the Bands contest held in 2003 in Belgrade playing their first single War Inside of You. The band has played well received shows appearing in many of the Balkans established music festivals including three performances at the Exit Festival in Novi Sad, Serbia. They have released an eponymous debut album on Automatik Records in 2007. Currently the band is working on a second album and continues playing concerts in Serbia and in former Yugoslav countries.

Early years 
In 2003, Smoke'n'Soul was declared the best demo band in Serbia, and a song War Inside Of You was published on a compilation CD called Rebel Demo. The band played many shows, including opening for Julian Marley and appearing in festival in Croatia Istra in Reggae and in Slovenia Soča Riversplash Festival.

Debut album 
During 2005 and 2006, Smoke'n'Soul recorded their first album. Miloš Iković and Vladimir Krkljuš took on recording and mixing duties and co-produced the album with Goran Živković and Vladan Matić doing postproduction. Album was released in 2007 and spawned a #1 radio hit single in Serbia - Find the Way. Videos were filmed for both Find the Way and One Day - a second single and a concert favorite.

Festivals 
The band had many successful appearances in well established festivals. In the early days Smoke'n'Soul appeared in Trenchtown Festival in Palić (Subotica) in 2002, in Rebel Demo in Belgrade in 2003. The band also performed three times at Exit Festival - in 2002, 2003 and 2005 at the Reggae Stage and in 2008 at the Fusion Stage (opening for Gentleman). In 2008 Smoke'n'Soul appeared at Reggae Serbia Festival in Pančevo. Another well received performance by the band took place in Kotor at the Refresh Festival in 2008.

Current activities 
Smoke'n'Soul has strong connections to Serbian reggae scene with some members playing in other bands as well - Irie FM, Burning Sounds, Eyesburn. While occasionally playing in the greater Belgrade region, the band is currently working on a follow-up album, tentatively entitled Soul Infected.

Collaborations 
Notable guest appearances include Asher Selector and Prince Alla.

Discography

Studio albums 
 Smoke'n'Soul (2007) - Automatik Records/Warner Music

Compilations 
 Rebel Demo - War Inside of You (2003) - Dom omladine Beograd

Videos 
 Find the Way (by Tamara Popov and Looney)
 One Day (by Nemanja Ličina)

Band members 
 Miloš Iković - lead vocal, rhythm guitar, tenor flute
 Vladimir Krkljuš – lead vocals, backing vocals, drums
 Vukašin Marković – lead vocals, trombone
 Nebojša Potkonjak – backing vocals, trumpet
 Andreja Bućan – tenor saxophone
 Vlada Jovanović - trumpet
 Ivan Jovanović - trombone
 Damjan Ćirilović – bass guitar
 Vladimir Tomić – backing vocals, lead guitar
 Rade Martinović – keyboards

References

External links 
 www.discogs.com
 www.last.fm
 music.myexit.org
 www.reggaeserbia.com
 www.b92.fm
 facebook.com
 myspace.com
 youtube.com

Serbian reggae musical groups